Synch (Everett Thomas) is a fictional character and mutant superhero appearing in American comic books published by Marvel Comics. Created by Scott Lobdell, he first appeared in X-Men #36 (September 1994).

Publication history

Synch debuted in the midst of the "Phalanx Covenant" crossover (1994), in X-Men (vol. 2) #36 (September 1994), written by Fabian Nicieza and pencils by Andy Kubert.

Synch iappeared as part of a new X-Men team in the "Reign of X" phase of the 2019 reboot of the X-Men line.

Fictional character biography

Generation X
Everett Thomas was born in St. Louis, Missouri.  He was first introduced when the mechanical collective race known as the Phalanx had assimilated the X-Men and attempted to wipe out what was to be the next generation of mutant heroes: Husk, Jubilee, Monet, Skin, and Blink, all of whom, with the exception of Blink, would eventually become members of Generation X.  Synch synced with Banshee, who was in the area, in order to defend himself from the Phalanx. However, as a side effect, he shattered all the windows nearby, which drew the attention of the local police. Even as they surrounded him, a few officers had already been infected by the Phalanx and again tried to capture Everett. He was saved by Banshee and Sabretooth, and then quickly helped them prevent yet another Phalanx attack on the White Queen and Jubilee, who had helped locate Everett. The White Queen linked her mind with Everett's and Jubilee's, which allowed Everett to synch with Jubilee and use her powers to a degree she had been afraid to, defeating the Phalanx for the moment.

This misfit band of heroes ended up saving the other kids who were captured by the Phalanx, and with the sacrifice of Blink, they escaped the menace. Following this, the kids were all relocated to the Massachusetts Academy where they would train to use their powers, receive a formal education, and act as Generation X, the next generation of X-Men, on the side. They were soon joined by new recruits Chamber, who had been invited by Charles Xavier, and Penance, a former prisoner of the mutant Emplate who had been liberated by Gateway.

Synch played a major role in many of Generation X's adventures, and was known for being both even-tempered and very resourceful in the growing use of his (and by extension, his teammates') powers. During one of Emplate's attacks, Synch fell under his thrall and became one of his vampire-like minions. This rendered most battle strategies against Synch useless, as he could use his teammates' powers against them without restraint, forcing them to employ more unconventional means.

Synch was also unknowingly a source of romantic tension among his female teammates. His close friendship with Jubilee eventually resulted in her having strong feelings for him. Synch never seemed aware of this and apparently did not feel the same way, due largely to a crush on Monet. For a time Synch was fixated on Gaia, who did initially seem just as interested in him. Shortly before a battle where the team could have died, Synch admitted to Monet he regretted never having a first kiss. Monet (who was being impersonated by her sisters Nicole and Claudette, unknown to Synch at the time) agreed to share one with him, which clearly left quite an impression on him, even once Nicole admitted the deception and the true Monet returned. Synch later began dating the true Monet after she admitted her feelings for him, but their relationship would be cut short by tragedy.

When Emma Frost's sister Adrienne Frost comes to America, she forces Emma to re-admit her back into the school. If not, Adrienne would release information to the parents of the normal students that the Xavier School for Gifted Youngsters was a secret training ground for mutants. Later, Adrienne created mutant hatred amongst the human students in the school. When the parents of the non-mutant students heard that their children were going to school with mutants, they all rushed to take their children away from the academy, causing a riot. However, Adrienne had planted bombs all around the school. Banshee and Synch set out to deactivate all the bombs, while Emma and Adrienne brutally fought. Eventually, Emma pulled out a gun and shot Adrienne. Meanwhile, Banshee and Synch separated. Synch found a bomb and there were human students nearby. He synced with the nearest mutant, Monet. However, she was too far away, so he only received a portion of her powers, which was her super strength. Using all his might, he threw the human kids out of the room, saving them from the explosion. Unfortunately, he was not able to save himself, dying to save his human peers.

Resurrections
Synch is later resurrected by means of the Transmode Virus to serve as part of Selene's army of deceased mutants.  Under the control of Selene and Eli Bard, he takes part in the assault on the mutant nation of Utopia.

Dawn of X
Synch was among the many mutants gathered on the island of Krakoa, after it was established as the new sovereign nation for mutants.

Some time later, Synch is assigned on a team with Darwin and X-23 to infiltrate the base of operations of the Children of the Vault.

Powers and abilities
Synch's mutant power equips him with a bio-energetic aura that allows him to duplicate the effect of the powers of any superpowered being in his vicinity and sometimes the power itself, essentially becoming "in synch" with that person (or more specifically, his or her bio-energetic aura). When Synch uses his powers, a multi-colored aura appears around his body. The aura is caused by the energies he is absorbing splitting the ambient light around him. Synch seemingly had greater mastery of his mutant abilities than his peers, often displaying more control over whatever powers he copied than that person. For example, he was also able to utilize Chamber's powers to fly, something Chamber was never able to do. It had been theorized that in time, Synch would have been able to permanently retain any powers he acquired. However, he is not always able to synch with purely physical abilities or abilities that exceed his physical makeup. In House of M, he was able to retain powers permanently as a junior member of S.H.I.E.L.D. If Synch had not died, he could have become one of the most powerful mutants in the Marvel Universe.

After his resurrection in the Dawn of X, it was noted by Dr. Cecilia Reyes that Synch's power no longer has a dormant and active state but that his Synchronistic field constantly seeks live connection to other power sets. Also, while before he seemed limited to mimicking only other mutants, he was found to now be able to copy powers from non-mutant sources as well.

Reception
 In 2014, Entertainment Weekly ranked Synch 53rd in their "Let's rank every X-Man ever" list.

Other versions

Age of Apocalypse
In the Age of Apocalypse, Synch was one of the many mutants killed in the war with Apocalypse.  
His dying before he got the chance to fight back was one of the reasons that Jubilee decided to join Gambit's band of mutant thieves, the X-Ternals.

Days of Future Past
In the Days of Future Past timeline, Everett became Jubilee's lover, and aided her along with the X-Men of that time to rebel against their oppressors.

House of M
In the House of M timeline, Synch was alive and a member of the junior S.H.I.E.L.D. division called "The Hellions", but was later killed during a battle with an alternate version of the Hellions, the New Mutants, and a Japan-based human resistance group which was founded by an alternate version of Laurie Garrison (Wallflower).

In other media

Film
In X2, when Mystique goes through the files on Yuriko's computer, a close inspection reveals that Stryker is keeping files on Synch.

References

External links
Synch on the Marvel Universe Character Bio Wiki
Bio at Sugarbombs.com
Profile at MarvelDirectory.com
Spotlight On Synch at Uncannyxmen.net 

Characters created by Scott Lobdell
Characters created by Chris Bachalo
Comics characters introduced in 1994
Fictional African-American people
Fictional characters from Missouri
Marvel Comics mutants
Marvel Comics superheroes
X-Men members